Fighter Weapons School can mean the following:
 Fighter Weapons School RAF, part of the Royal Air Force
 Fighter Weapons School, part of the Hellenic Air Force Tactical Command
 Tactics and Air Combat Development Establishment, Indian Air Force
 United States Navy Fighter Weapons School, now the United States Navy Strike Fighter Tactics Instructor program
 United States Air Force Fighter Weapons School now the USAF Weapons School